Noori Masjid is a Mosque in situated under Madarsa Islamiya Shamsul Huda, Patna and between Bari Path and Ashok Rajpath near Science College, Patna.

It was named after its land Donater Syed Noorul Huda who donated land for both Madarsa and Mosque.

References 

Mosques in Bihar